() is one of six districts of Xiamen, People's Republic of China.

The total local resident population is 280,000. Jimei District has a rich history and vibrant culture. It hosts modern facilities such as universities, a culture center, cinema, stadium, library and culture square.

Administration

Street Committee (街道, jiedao)
Jimei (Chi-mei)
Xinglin
Qiaoying

Town (镇, zhen)
Xinglin
Guankou
Houxi

Transportation
Xiamen Bridge and the 2008 Jimei Bridge connect Jimei to Xiamen island. The former was for long the only mainland gateway to the Xiamen Special Economic Zone. City's new main Xiamen North Railway Station placed there. First line of Xiamen Metro will connect Jimei with island part in 2017.

Education

Jimei is the educational hub of Xiamen with over 90 years of history. The famous overseas Chinese, Chen Jiageng,  established the Jimei Educational Institution. This is a complete educational system which consists of kindergarten, primary school, middle school to high school. He was also influential in the establishment of universities such as Jimei University and Huaqiao University.

Economy
Jimei, now together with the built-up core of the former Xinglin district, is one of the districts in the Xiamen municipal region targeted at Taiwanese investments. In the last ten years, economic activity has grown substantially in Jimei. It is a hub for services, basic and manufacturing industries. Jimei District attracted 610 foreign investment projects with value of US$2.693 billion. The total GDP of the district reached 8.335 billion yuan.

It now has the north industrial area, Xingbie industrial area, Guangnan industrial area, Central Asia industrial area and Xingna Industrial area.

Jimei Foreign Investment Bureau

Jimei Foreign Investment Bureau is located in the north of Jimei and is on the west side of Fuxia Road. The zone was approved to be established in December 1992 by the State Council. The current developed zone is 6.85 km2. The zone is located in the Jimei, Xiamen. The main industries encouraged are electronics, metallurgy and garment. The zone is 9 km away from the Xiamen Gaoqi International Airport and 4.5 km away from the 319 National Highway.

Xinglin Taiwan Merchants Development Zone

Xinglin Taiwan Merchants Development Zone was approved to be established on 20 May 1989 by the State Council. The zone is located in the district. The main industries encouraged in the zone are chemistry, machinery, textile and electronics.

References

External links

http://www.jimei.gov.cn/ Jimei Government Website (Chinese)
http://www.xm.gov.cn/ Xiamen Government Website

Geography of Xiamen
County-level divisions of Fujian